The Dynamic Billard Albanian Open 2016 was a 9-Ball pool tournament, and the fourth Euro Tour event of 2016. The event was held between 5–7 August 2016, at the Tirana Expo Center in Tirana, Albania. The event was won by Mateusz Śniegocki, who defeated Joshua Filler 9–4 in the final.

Tournament format
The event was played as a double elimination knockout tournament, until the last 32 stage; where the tournament was contested as a single elimination bracket.

Prize fund 
The tournament prize fund was similar to that of other Euro Tour events, with €4,500 awarded to the winner of the event.

Tournament results

References

External links

 Official Website

Euro Tour
Albanian Open
Albanian Open
Albanian Open
International sports competitions hosted by Albania
Sports competitions in Tirana
Cue sports in Albania